The Pennsylvania Department of Labor and Industry is a cabinet-level agency in the Government of Pennsylvania. The agency is charged with the task of overseeing the health and safety of workers, enforcement of the Pennsylvania Uniform Construction Code, vocational rehabilitation for people with disabilities, and administration of unemployment benefits and Workers' compensation.

When it was founded by Governor John Kinley Tener, John Price Jackson was appointed as the first Commissioner. Jackson was confirmed in post by Governor Martin Grove Brumbaugh on 2 June 1917, but took a leave of absence from state office when accepted a Commission in the US Army following the United States entry into the First World War.

See also
 Government of Pennsylvania
 List of Pennsylvania state agencies

References

External links

State agencies of Pennsylvania
1913 establishments in Pennsylvania
Government agencies established in 1913
State departments of labor of the United States